Emine Demir (born November 11, 1993) is a Turkish women's football defender, who plays in the Women's Super League for Fatih Vatan Spor with jersey number 24. She was a member of the Turkey girls' U-17, Turkey women's U-19, women's U-21 and Turkey women's teams.

Early years 
She was born in Taşbaşı village of Hakkari in southeastern Turkey on November 11, 1993. She began football playing in the regional primary boarding school of the Association for the Support of Contemporary Living. Her first club Malatya Gençlik ve Spor provided her scholarship for education in the Sports High School in Malatya. She supports her family financially.

Club career 

Emine Demir of Hakkarigücü Spor in the 2018–19 Turish Women's First.

She received her license for Malatya Gençlik ve Spor on November 16, 2007, and played the 2008–09 season in the Turkish Women's Second League. The next season, she moved to Mersin Camspor to play in the Women's First League. In the 2010–11 season, she was transferred by Adana İdmanyurduspor, which was promoted to the Women's First League one season later. Dmir has been part of Trabzon İdmanocağı since 2012. After three full and a half seasons, she moved to Hakkarigücü Spor in her hometown to play in the Women's Second League. She earned her team's promotion to the Women's First league in the 2018–19 season. In October 2019, she transferred to the Istanbulbased club Ataşehir Belediyespor.

Galatasaray 
On 22 August 2022, the Turkish Women's Football Super League team was transferred to the Galatasaray club.

Fatih Vatan Spor 
In the second half of the 2022–23 season, she returned to her former club Fatih Vatan Spor.

International career 

Emine Demir was admitted to the Turkey girls' U-17 team to play at the 2009 UEFA Women's Under-17 Championship – Group 5 matches. She debuted in the game against Faroe Islands on October 23, 2008.

She Became a member of the Turkey women's U-19 team playing for the first time in the 2011 Kuban Spring Tournament against Ukraine on March 6, 2011. She played at the 2011 UEFA Women's U-19 Championship Second qualifying round – Group 3 and 2012 UEFA Women's Under-19 Championship – Group A matches. She capped in total 19 times for the Turkey women's U-19 team.

On November 26, 2014, she appeared for Turkey women's U-21 team in a friendly match against Belgium.

In February 2015, Emine Demir was called up to the Turkey women's. She was a substitute at the friendly matches against the Georgian women. On August 19, 2015, she debuted in the Turkey women's team appearing in the friendly match against Albania.

Career statistics 
.

Honours 
 Turkish Women's First League
 Adana İdmanyurduspor
 Third place (1): 2010–11

 Trabzon İdmanocağı
 Third places (2): 2014–15, 2015–16

 Turkish Women's Second League
 Hakkarigücü Spor
 Second places (1): 2017–18

References

External links 

1993 births
Living people
Sportspeople from Hakkari
Turkish women's footballers
Women's association football defenders
Turkey women's international footballers
Adana İdmanyurduspor players
Trabzon İdmanocağı women's players
Hakkarigücü Spor players
Ataşehir Belediyespor players
Fatih Vatan Spor players
Turkish Women's Football Super League players
Galatasaray S.K. women's football players